Shayxontoxur is one of 12 districts (tuman) of Tashkent, the capital of Uzbekistan.

Overview
It is a north-western district, established in 1981 with the name of Oktober, referring to the October Revolution, part of Russian Revolution of 1917. It is the most densely populated tuman.

Shayxontoxur borders with the districts of Uchtepa, Chilanzar, Yakkasaray, Yunusabad and Olmazar. It borders also with Tashkent Region and is close to the Uzbek frontier with South Kazakhstan Region, in Kazakhstan.

References

External links

Districts of Tashkent
Populated places established in 1981
1981 establishments in the Soviet Union